Nidia Rosa Pardo Marrugo (born 2 October 1984) is a Venezuelan weightlifter.
She competed at the 2012 Pan American Weightlifting Championships finishing third, 2013 Pan American Weightlifting Championships finishing fourth, and  2013 World Weightlifting Championships.

References 

Living people

1984 births

Venezuelan female weightlifters
20th-century Venezuelan women
21st-century Venezuelan women